The 2014 Travelers Men's NOCA Provincials, the provincial men's curling championship for Northern Ontario, were held from February 5 to 10 at the McIntyre Curling Club in Schumacher, Ontario. The winning Jeff Currie rink represented Northern Ontario at the 2014 Tim Hortons Brier in Kamloops.

Teams
The defending champion Brad Jacobs rink did not participate in the event, as they are representing Canada at the 2014 Winter Olympics.

Round-robin standings
Final round-robin standings

Round-robin results

Draw 1
Wednesday, February 5, 2:30 pm

Draw 2
Wednesday, February 5, 7:30 pm

Draw 3
Thursday, February 6, 1:00 pm

Draw 4
Thursday, February 6, 7:30 pm

Draw 5
Friday, February 7, 12:00 pm

Draw 6
Friday, February 7, 7:30 pm

Draw 7
Saturday, February 8, 9:30 am

Tiebreakers
Saturday, February 8, 2:30 pm

Saturday, February 8, 7:30 pm

Playoffs

Semifinal
Sunday, February 9, 9:00 am

Final
Sunday, February 9, 2:00 pm

External links

Travelers Men's NOCA Provincials
Curling in Northern Ontario
Sport in Timmins
Travelers Men's NOCA Provincials
Travelers Men's NOCA Provincials